Qahraman or Qahreman may refer to:
 Qahreman, Kurdistan
 Qahraman, West Azerbaijan